Dhubri  is the terminal railway station on the Fakiragram–Dhubri branch line. It also links to the New Cooch Behar–Golokganj branch line.  A new line is being laid to connect Dhubri with Jogighopa.  It is located on the west bank of the Brahmaputra in Dhubri district in the Indian state of Assam. Important trains like Alipurduar–Silghat Town Rajya Rani Express, Siliguri–Dhubri Intercity Express are available from Dhubri. It lies under Alipurduar railway division of Northeast Frontier Railway zone.

Geography
Dhubri district occupies the south-west corner of Assam. It borders on Bangladesh, and the Indian states of West Bengal and Meghalaya. The Brahmaputra divides the district into two parts. Tributaries of the Brahmaputra such as Gangadhar, Gaurang, Tipkai, Champamoti in the north and Jinjiram, Jinari and Kaloo in the south are all major contributors of floods in the area.

History
The Fakiragram–Dhubri line was opened in September 2010 after conversion to  broad gauge. Dhubri railway station had initially been opened in 1904. Flood waters had washed away the tracks in 1988.

Up to the sixties there was a -wide metre-gauge railway link from Cooch Behar to Dhubri via Golokganj.  It was then known as the Assam Line Railway Service. It also connected East Pakistan, even after partition.  However, collapse of the rail-cum-road bridge over the Gadadhar in the seventies ended that link. The bridge has been rebuilt and the track laid again as broad gauge. Dhubri-New Jalpaiguri Inter-city Express via Alipurduar Jn was introduced in February 2012.

References

External links

Railway stations in Dhubri district
Alipurduar railway division
Transport in Dhubri